Sharon McCarthy may refer to:

Sharon McCarthy, character of PS, I Love You
Sharon McCarthy, character of All Good Things (film)
Sharon McCarthy (basketball), in Wheelchair basketball at the 1992 Summer Paralympics